Kaempferitrin is a chemical compound. It can be isolated from the leaves of Hedyotis verticillata and from Onychium japonicum.

Kaempferitrin is the 3,7-dirhamnoside of kaempferol.

References 

Kaempferol glycosides
Flavonol rhamnosides